Triphosa rantaizanensis is a species of moth of the family Geometridae that is endemic to Taiwan.

References

External links

Moths described in 1916
Moths of Asia
Endemic fauna of Taiwan
Rheumapterini